Yangi-Aul (Yañawıl) is a rural locality (a khutor) in Bakhmutsky Selsoviet, Kuyurgazinsky District, Bashkortostan, Russia. The population was 15 as of 2010. There is 1 street.

Geography 
Yangi-Aul is located 14 km southeast of Yermolayevo (the district's administrative centre) by road. Bakhmut is the nearest rural locality.

References 

Rural localities in Kuyurgazinsky District